Rafael Duk Delgado is a Mexican gridiron football coach and former player who is the current head coach of the Burros Blancos IPN. As a head coach, Duk won the 2000 ONEFA national championship with the Borregos Salvajes CEM before leading the Mexicas CDMX to a win in Tazón México III in 2018.

Playing career
Duk played college football with the Pieles Rojas IPN at the guard position, representing the Instituto Politécnico Nacional from 1984 to 1989. He was a part of the 1989 ONEFA national championship team under head coach Manuel Rodero.

Coaching career
Duk was hired as the first head coach of the Borregos Salvajes CEM for their debut season in ONEFA in 1994, where they began in the second-tier National Conference. He led the team to its historic first win in their opening game, beating the  39–27. Duk guided the team to a 6–1 record and an appearance in the National Conference championship game, where they lost 13–0 to the Panteras Negras UAM. After losing in the championship game again the following year, the team was successful in its third attempt, defeating the  28–6 in the 1996 National Conference championship game after an undefeated season and earning promotion to the 10 Grandes Conference – the highest ONEFA tier.

In 2000, Duk led the Borregos Salvajes CEM to another undefeated season and its first-ever ONEFA national championship, defeating the Borregos Salvajes Monterrey 38–28 in the 10 Grandes Conference final. He earned five consecutive ONEFA Coach of the Year awards from 1996 to 2000. Duk quit following the 2001 season, in which his team was eliminated in the semifinals by the Auténticos Tigres UANL.

Duk won a  championship in 2002 as head coach of the semi-pro Pieles Rojas A.C. In 2003, he coached the Lobos UAdeC of the Autonomous University of Coahuila, though the team finished the season with a losing record. He returned to the semi-pro ranks after that, coaching the Petroleros de Pemex in 2004 and the Pieles Rojas A.C. in 2005.

Linces UVM
Duk took the reins of the Linces UVM of the Universidad del Valle de México in 2005 as the new team's first-ever head coach. In his first season, he led the team to a promotion to the top-tier 12 Grandes Conference after winning the second-tier National Conference title. Duk earned his sixth ONEFA Coach of the Year award and became the first head coach to achieve promotion to the top tier with two different teams. He was replaced by Roberto Cervantes, his defensive coordinator, following the 2012 season.

Duk was subsequently offered the head coaching job of the Toros Salvajes Chapingo, but was unable to accept due to personal reasons.

Raptors de Naucalpan
In November 2015, Duk was announced as the first head coach of the Raptors de Naucalpan, members of a new professional spring league called the Liga de Fútbol Americano Profesional (LFA). In the league's inaugural season in 2016, the team finished the season with a 4–2 record and reached Tazón México I, the first edition of the LFA championship game, where they lost 29–13 to the Mayas CDMX.

Mexicas CDMX
In October 2017, Duk joined another LFA team, the Mexicas CDMX, as their new head coach. In his only season with the team, he led the Mexicas to its first league championship with a 17–0 victory over the Raptors de Naucalpan in Tazón México III after finishing the regular season with a 4–3 record.

In 2018, Duk led the Raptors to a 5–2 record and a first-place finish in the North Division, with league MVP Bruno Márquez at quarterback. However, they were eliminated in the first round of the playoffs after suffering a 1310 defeat to the Dinos de Saltillo.

Bulldogs de Naucalpan
In September 2018, Duk was announced as the head coach of the Bulldogs de Naucalpan of the Liga de Football Pro (later Fútbol Americano de México), a new football league that began its inaugural season that February to compete with the LFA.

Búhos IPN
In 2019, Duk was named the sixth head coach in the history of the Búhos IPN program, which was returning to Mexican football for the first time since 1985. In his first year at the helm, he led the team to an undefeated season capped off by a 41–15 victory over the Lobos Plateados IPN to win the  league title. The 2020 season was cancelled due to the COVID-19 pandemic. In 2021, the Búhos returned to ONEFA, after a 36-year absence, as a member of its Center-South Conference. Duk led the team to a 3–1 record, sitting atop of the Group A standings when the rest of the season was also cancelled. The Búhos subsequently won the third-tier National Central Conference title in 2022, defeating the  20–17 in the final.

Burros Blancos IPN
Duk was named the head coach of the  ahead of the 2023 season.

National team
Duk served as the offensive coordinator for the Mexico national team at the 1999 IFAF World Championship held in Italy, helping the team win a silver medal. He won another silver medal at the 2003 edition held in Germany, this time as an assistant head coach.

As a head coach, Duk led Team Mexico to bronze medals at the 2003 and 2007 NFL Global Junior Championships held in San Diego and Miami, respectively. He also commandeered the Mexico under-19 national team to consecutive bronze medals at the 2014 and 2016 editions of the IFAF U-19 World Championship held in Kuwait and China, respectively.

Personal life
Duk studied business administration at the Universidad del Valle de México.

Duk coached his son, Rafael Duk Ochoa, on the Búhos IPN.

References

Living people
1960s births
Mexican players of American football
American football guards

Mexican sports coaches
Coaches of American football
Universidad del Valle de México alumni